Yusupbek Mukhlisi (1920–2004) was a Uyghur nationalist and the leader of the United Revolutionary Front of East Turkestan (URFET). He lived in-exile with other former URFET members in Almaty, Kazakhstan, after fleeing to the Soviet Union in 1960.

Along with Taynutdin Basakov, Mukhlisi also led the Committee for East Turkestan until its dissolution around the late 1990s.

References

East Turkestan independence activists
Uyghur nationalists
1920 births
2004 deaths
People granted political asylum in the Soviet Union
Chinese emigrants to the Soviet Union